Palane Vajiragnana Thero (November 25, 1878 – September 21, 1955) was a Sri Lankan (Sinhala) scholar Buddhist monk, who founded the Siri Vajiraramaya temple in Bambalapitiya, Sri Lanka. He was also the Maha Nayaka (head) of Amarapura Sri Dharmarakshita sect for 37 years from August 5, 1918 until his death in 1955.

Early life 
Palane Vajiragnana Thero was born to a family in Pelene, Weligama in Matara District on 28 July 1878. His father was Muhandiram Don Andris Tudawe Pandita Gunawardene, a well known Oriental scholar at the time and his mother was Dona Gimara Serasinghe. His lay name was Aron Pandita Gunawardena.  Aron had his early education at the village vernacular school and for his English education he was sent to the bilingual school at Mirissa. At the age of 15, on July 20, 1890, he was ordained a monk under the tutelage of Weragampita Siri Revata Maha Thero, who was himself a well known oriental and Buddhist scholar, at Devagiri Vihara, Kabmurugamuwa with the given name Palane Vajiranana. In 1897, he was admitted to Vidyodaya Pirivena, Colombo under Hikkaduwe Sri Sumangala Mahanāyaka Thero and passed in 1900 winning the Siyāmarāja Prize for the best student of that year. He received higher ordination on April 20, 1900 at the Udakakkhepa Sima on River Nilvalā in Matara.

Establishment of Siri Vajirārāmaya Temple 
In the 1880s the Buddhists living in Bambalapitiya area formed a society with the name Dharma Samagama, meaning Dharma Society. Later they built a hall for the preaching of the Dhamma (Dharma Sālāwa). They constructed a small room with basic facilities as an adjunct and in 1901 invited young Pelene Vajirañāna to come and reside. He was brought in procession from his temporary residence in Siri Suviddharamaya, Wellawatta. This was the genesis of the present Vajirārāmaya and gradually he built it up with a character of its own.  A Bo tree was planted to symbolise Buddha's Enlightenment and a small Vihara-ge was later constructed with a serene seated Buddha image. In 1909 Muhandiram P. J. Kulatilake built the library with two rooms and donated it to the Sangha. The Vajirārāma Dhamma School was started in 1918 and among the students who studied in this Dhamma School were future leading politicians of Sri Lanka. Dudley Senanayake, J. R. Jayewardene, Bernard Zoysa, R. Premadasa, Chandrika Bandaranaike and Anura Bandaranaike, Lalith Athulathmudali were a few such leaders.

Scholarship 
He was considered by his students to be knowledgeable of the Buddhist Texts (Tipitaka), the commentaries and the sub commentaries. Many of his articles are compiled and published under the title Sri Vajrañāna Sahitya. He was made a member of the Pracheena Bhasopakara Samitiya in 1905 on the recommendation of Hikkaduwe Sri Sumangala Mahanayaka Thera and seconded by Sri Subhuti Mahanayaka Thera. He was only 27 years of age.

Among his contemporaries were Kalukondayave Pannasekera Mahanayaka Thera, Anagarika Dharmapala, Piyadasa Sirisena, W. A. Silva, Sir D. B. Jayatilaka, Dr. G. P. Malalasekera and Munidasa Kumaratunga. In 1937, he started the Bauddha Lamaya magazine in Sinhala and it had continued to date as a monthly publication of the Vajirārāmaya temple. For the English speaking Buddhist children a similar magazine called 'Bosat' was started. In addition, a Paper called Lak Budu Sasuna was commenced to which he contributed regularly.

Broadcaster 
Pelene Vajirañāna Maha Thera was the first broadcaster of a Buddhist Sermon over the radio in Sri Lanka.  It was delivered on April 21, 1928. His style of delivery was followed by his pupil monks. The head of the Vidyodaya Pirivena, Mahagoda Ñanissara thero, said that Pelene Thero has mastered the 'pelena' (plan) to deliver effective sermons.

Vajirārāmaya Tradition 
Pelene Mahanayaka Thera was very concerned with following the monastic rules of discipline as mentioned in the Pāṭimokkha. All monks at Vajirārāmaya were distinct because of this and were easily recognized. Some of the notable features were the shaving of both the head and beard at same time, using of the alms-bowl for partaking of meals, using a natural dye made by boiling the root of Jack trees and bark of banyan trees when preparing robes. This unique colour of the robe came to be known as the ‘Vajirārāma-colour’, and the dye made by incorporating this colour was known ‘Vajirārāma-dye’. Rules and procedures pertaining to Vajirārāmaya and the monks ordained by him were laid down in the Vajirārāma Katikavata of January 12, 1940.

Pupils 
Following the tradition of teacher to pupil, he passed down his vast knowledge of the Dhamma and the high monastic traditions he meticulously followed to his pupil monks who in their own way became great achievers. His first pupil was Narada Maha Thera, a Buddhist scholar monk and missionary. Other Maha Theras were Madihe Pannasiha, Piyadassi, Ampitiye Rahula, Ñānamoli and Ñānavira English monks. Amitananda Maha Thera and Subhodanada Thera of Nepal were also his pupils. Madihe Paññāsiha Maha Thera, one of his pupils, succeeded him as the Mahanayaka of the Amarapura Sri Dharmarakshita sect.

Honours and death 
After an illness Pelene Vajirañāna Mahanayaka Thera died on September 21, 1955. With State patronage he was cremated in the presence of over 500,000 devotees of all ranks and religions at the Independence Square esplanade on September 25, 1955. His cremation was reported in the local Press (Dinamina) the next day in the following terms:

Notes and references

 Sri Vajrañāna Sahityaya 1 & 2 compiled by Ven Madihe Paññāsiha Mahanayaka Thera, 1960
 Sasunambara Payu Supun Sanda by Ven Tirikunamale Ananda Anunayaka Thera, 2013 
 Guna Pabanda (Collection of Articles of Most Venerable Pelene Vajirañāna), 1956
 Siri Vajirañāna Charitaya by David Karunaratne, 1955
 Tipitaka Dharmakosaya, Ven Sri Vajirañāna Commemorative Volume, 1978
 Dinamina National Newspaper of September 26, 1955
 Siridamräki Sanga Parapura, Tangalle Dirilakuru, 1978
 Pujita Jivita, Vol.1, 1989

External links
 Siri Vajiraramaya Temple-Sri Lanka

1878 births
1955 deaths
Sri Lankan Buddhist monks
Sri Lankan Theravada Buddhists
Theravada Buddhist monks
People from Matara, Sri Lanka
Sinhalese monks